Marble Valley is an unincorporated community in Coosa County, Alabama, United States.

History
Marble Valley is named after the Sylacauga marble found and quarried locally.
A post office called Marble Valley was established in 1852, and remained in operation until it was discontinued in 1934. Marble Valley became a site for soldiers to volunteer to join the Confederate States Army from Coosa County. One soldier from Marble Valley, William Wood, wrote letters home to his family during the Civil War. After his death in a northern prison in 1863, his brothers compiled the letters and information from fellow soldiers into memoirs.

References

Unincorporated communities in Coosa County, Alabama
Unincorporated communities in Alabama